The masked saltator (Saltator cinctus) is a species passerine bird in the tanager family Thraupidae.

It is found in southern Colombia, Ecuador, and Peru. The species is found in two small disjunct ranges, as well as smaller localized areas in Ecuador and Peru.

Its natural habitat is subtropical or tropical moist montane forests where it is threatened by habitat loss.

References

masked saltator
Birds of the Ecuadorian Andes
Birds of the Peruvian Andes
masked saltator
masked saltator
Taxonomy articles created by Polbot